Bahadurpur Union is a union parishad situated at Bheramara Upazila,  in Kushtia District, Khulna Division of Bangladesh. There are 15 villages and 4 mouzas in the union.

References

External links
 

Unions of Khulna Division
Unions of Bheramara Upazila
Unions of Kushtia District